The 1991 siege of Kijevo was one of the earliest clashes of the Croatian War of Independence. The 9th Corps of the Yugoslav People's Army (JNA) led by Colonel Ratko Mladić and the forces of the Serbian Autonomous Oblast (region) of Krajina (SAO Krajina) under Knin police chief Milan Martić besieged the Croat-inhabited village of Kijevo in late April and early May 1991. The initial siege was lifted after negotiations that followed major protests in Split against the JNA.

The JNA and the SAO Krajina forces renewed the blockade in mid-August. Kijevo was captured on 26 August, and subsequently looted and burned. The fighting in Kijevo was significant as one of the first instances when the JNA openly sided with the SAO Krajina against Croatian authorities. The Croatian police fled Kijevo towards the town of Drniš and the remaining Croatian population left the village.

Martić was tried at the International Criminal Tribunal for the former Yugoslavia (ICTY) on several different charges of war crimes including, his involvement in the siege of Kijevo. The trial resulted in a guilty verdict, and the findings of the Trial Chamber regarding Kijevo, made in 2007, were confirmed by the ICTY Appeals Chamber in 2008, based on witness testimonies about it being ethnic cleansing. The siege was the first instance of use of the ethnic cleansing in the Yugoslav Wars. Croatian authorities tried Mladić in absentia and convicted him for war crimes committed in Kijevo.

Background
In 1990, ethnic tensions between Serbs and Croats worsened after the electoral defeat of the government of the Socialist Republic of Croatia by the Croatian Democratic Union (Hrvatska demokratska zajednica, HDZ). The Yugoslav People's Army (Jugoslovenska Narodna Armija – JNA) confiscated Croatia's Territorial Defence (Teritorijalna obrana – TO) weapons to minimize resistance. Serbia, supported by Montenegro and Serbia's provinces of Vojvodina and Kosovo, unsuccessfully tried to obtain the Yugoslav Presidency's approval for a JNA operation to disarm Croatian security forces in January 1991. The request was denied and a bloodless skirmish between Serb insurgents and Croatian special police in March prompted the JNA itself to ask the Federal Presidency to give it wartime authority and declare a state of emergency. Even though the request was backed by Serbia and its allies, the JNA was denied on 15 March. Serbian President Slobodan Milošević, preferring a campaign to expand Serbia rather than to preserve Yugoslavia with Croatia as a federal unit, publicly threatened to replace the JNA with a Serbian army and declared that he no longer recognized the authority of the federal Presidency. The threat caused the JNA to gradually abandon plans to preserve Yugoslavia in favour of expansion of Serbia as the JNA came under Milošević's control. By the end of March, the conflict had escalated to the first fatalities. In early April, leaders of the Serb revolt in Croatia declared their intention to integrate areas under their control with Serbia. These were viewed by the Government of Croatia as breakaway regions.

At the beginning of 1991, Croatia had no regular army. To bolster its defence, Croatia doubled police personnel to about 20,000. The most effective part of the force was 3,000-strong special police deployed in twelve battalions and adopting military organization of the units. There were also 9,000–10,000 regionally organized reserve police set up in 16 battalions and 10 companies. The reserve force lacked weapons. As a response to the deteriorating situation, the Croatian government established the Croatian National Guard (Zbor narodne garde – ZNG) in May by merging the special police battalions into four all-professional guards brigades together consisting of approximately 8,000 troops subordinate to the Ministry of Defence headed by retired JNA General Martin Špegelj. The regional police, by then expanded to 40,000, was also attached to the ZNG and reorganized in 19 brigades and 14 independent battalions. The guards brigades were the only units of the ZNG that were fully armed with small arms; throughout the ZNG there was a lack of heavier weapons and there was no command and control structure. The shortage of heavy weapons was so severe that the ZNG resorted to using World War II weapons taken from museums and film studios. At the time, Croatian stockpile of weapons consisted of 30,000 small arms purchased abroad and 15,000 previously owned by the police. A new 10,000-strong special police was established then to replace the personnel lost to the guards brigades.

Prelude
In 1991, Kijevo was a village of 1,261 people, 99.6% of whom were Croats. It was surrounded by the Serb villages of Polača, Civljane and Cetina. Following the Log revolution, the three Serb villages had become part of the SAO Krajina and road access to Kijevo was restricted as barricades were set up in Polača and Civljane on the roads serving the village. In response, its population set up an ad hoc militia.

Following the Plitvice Lakes incident of 1 April 1991, SAO Krajina forces captured three Croatian policemen from nearby Drniš, with the intention of exchanging them for Croatian Serb troops taken prisoner by the Croatian forces at the Plitvice Lakes. In turn, the militia established by the residents of Kijevo captured several Serb civilians and demanded that the captured policemen be released in exchange for their prisoners. On 2 April, JNA intelligence officers reported on this, and warned how local militias in Kijevo and Civljane, otherwise separated by barricades, were engaged in armed skirmishes that threatened to escalate. Kijevo became strategically significant because its location hindered SAO Krajina road communications.

April–May blockade

In the night of 27/28 April, a group of Croatian Ministry of the Interior officers managed to reach Kijevo, and a Croatian police station was formally established in the village on 28 April. The following day, JNA troops, commanded by the JNA 9th (Knin) Corps chief of staff Colonel Ratko Mladić, moved in, cutting all access and preventing delivery of supplies to Kijevo. On 2 May, a Croatian police helicopter made an emergency landing in Kijevo after sustaining damage caused by SAO Krajina troops gunfire. The helicopter was carrying then defence minister Luka Bebić and Parliament of Croatia deputy speaker Vladimir Šeks. The aircraft was able to take off after repairs the same day. Another skirmish took place on 2 May on Mount Kozjak, where a member of the SAO Krajina paramilitary was killed while on guard duty.

Croatian President Franjo Tuđman called on the public to bring the siege to an end, and the plea resulted in a large-scale protest against the JNA in Split, organised by the Croatian Trade Union Association in the Brodosplit Shipyard on 6 May 1991. On 7 May, 80 tanks and tracked vehicles and 23 wheeled vehicles of the JNA 10th Motorised Brigade left barracks in Mostar, only to be stopped by civilians ahead of Široki Brijeg, west of Mostar. The convoy remained in place for three days as the crowd demanded that the JNA lift the siege of Kijevo. The protest ended after Alija Izetbegović, the President of the Presidency of Bosnia and Herzegovina, visited and addressed the protesters, assuring the crowd that the convoy was heading to Kupres rather than Kijevo. Tuđman and Cardinal Franjo Kuharić sent telegrams to the protesters supporting Izetbegović. The siege of Kijevo was lifted through negotiations a few days later, two weeks after the blockade had been imposed.

August blockade
The May arrangement proved short-lived, as the JNA units, again led by Mladić, put up barricades to prevent entry into the village on 17 August 1991. The next day, the Croatian Serb leader Milan Martić laid down an ultimatum to the police and inhabitants of Kijevo, demanding that they leave the village and its vicinity within two days—or face an armed attack.

Between 23 and 25 August, Croatian forces evacuated nearly the entire civilian population of the village. On 25 August, Croatian forces launched a failed attack on JNA barracks in Sinj,  to the southeast of Kijevo. The objective of the attack was to obtain weapons, needed as Croatian positions near Kijevo deteriorated.

On 26 August, the JNA attacked Kijevo, opposed by 58 policemen armed with small arms only and commanded by police station chief Martin Čičin Šain. Between 05:18 and 13:00, the JNA fired 1,500 artillery shells against the village, and the Yugoslav Air Force supported the attack with 34 close air support sorties. The same afternoon, the JNA mounted a ground force assault on Kijevo. According to Martić, each house in Kijevo was fired upon. The attacking force consisted of approximately 30 tanks supported by JNA infantry and Croatian Serb militia.

The JNA entered the village by 16:30. Lieutenant Colonel Borislav Đukić, in command of the Tactical Group-1 tasked with capture of Kijevo and the commanding officer of the JNA 221st Motorised Infantry Brigade, reported that the village was secured by 22:30. The Croatian police fled Kijevo in three groups via Mount Kozjak towards Drniš. The remaining Croatian population left after the artillery had destroyed much of their settlements. The retreating groups were pursued by the Yugoslav Air Force jets as they made their way across the Kozjak. Radio Television Belgrade reporter Vesna Jugović recorded these events. Krajina units commanded by Martić acted in concert with JNA to take command of the area.

Aftermath
The clash between the Croatian forces and the JNA in Kijevo was one of the first instances where the JNA openly sided with the insurgent Serbs in the rapidly escalating Croatian War of Independence, acting based on Martić's ultimatum. The defending force suffered only two wounded, but one of the retreating groups was captured. The group, consisting of 20 men, were later released in a prisoner of war exchange. The JNA suffered no casualties. After the JNA secured Kijevo, the village was looted and torched. The destruction of Kijevo became one of the most notorious Serb crimes in the early stages of the war. The JNA units which took part in the fighting in and around Kijevo advanced towards Sinj in the following few days, capturing Vrlika before being redeployed to take part in the Battle of Šibenik in mid-September.

At the International Criminal Tribunal for the former Yugoslavia, the trial of Milan Martić resulted in a guilty verdict with regard to Martić's involvement on Kijevo, and the findings of the Trial Chamber in 2007 regarding Kijevo were confirmed by the Appeals Chamber in 2008, based on witness testimonies about it being ethnic cleansing. The siege of Kijevo was the first instance of application of the strategy of ethnic cleansing in the Yugoslav Wars. The events at Kijevo were not included in the indictment at the trial of Ratko Mladić, but the Croatian judiciary tried Mladić in absentia for war crimes committed in Kijevo. He was convicted and sentenced to 20 years in prison.

References

Sources
Books and scientific papers

 

 
 

News reports

 

 

Other sources

 

 
 
 

1991 in Croatia
Conflicts in 1991
Sieges involving Croatia
Ethnic cleansing in the Yugoslav Wars
Serbian war crimes in the Croatian War of Independence
Republic of Serbian Krajina
1991 in Yugoslavia
Battles of the Croatian War of Independence
August 1991 events in Europe